Lindhorst is a municipality in the district of Schaumburg, in Lower Saxony, Germany. It is situated approximately 8 km northeast of Stadthagen, and 35 km east of Minden.

Lindhorst is also the seat of the Samtgemeinde ("collective municipality") Lindhorst.

References

Schaumburg
Principality of Schaumburg-Lippe